Karl Marx and Friedrich Engels considered the Romantic-aristocratic critiques of capitalism as belonging to the current they called feudal socialism: "half lamentation, half lampoon; half an echo of the past, half menace of the future; at times, by its bitter, witty and incisive criticism, striking the bourgeoisie to the very heart’s core; but always ludicrous in its effect, through total incapacity to comprehend the march of modern history." Pyotr Semyonovich Kogan, on the other hand, believed that the Romantics "were, thanks to the strength of their criticism, able to discover many errors of the Enlightenment, which forced progressive writers to proceed more cautiously and not
repeat the mistakes of the past." For A. Vishnevsky, "the pathos of Romantic art lies in exposing the disharmony of the modern world, in an unaccountable striving for the integrity of human development and harmonious social relations. However, the struggle against the ugliness and philistinism of capitalist civilization takes on a reactionary-utopian character among the Romantics; illusory dreaminess and inability to sober objective study and depiction of reality are typical of Romantic art in general.

These features of art show Romanticism's departure from the tasks of realistic art, from the demand for artistic reflection of the real conditions of human historical activity. Due to this, the irrational and religious-mystical principle becomes an essential element of the Romantic art, and sometimes even the exclusive source of its poetic pathos (Novalis, Chateaubriand, Coleridge).

Vladimir Lenin wrote of Romanticism: "Unlike the enlighteners with their ardent belief in the progressiveness of this social development, with their merciless enmity, wholly and exclusively directed against the remnants of antiquity, the Romantic, falling into a reactionary illusion, commits his "typical mistake" - the conclusion from the contradictions of capitalism to the denial that [capitalism] contains a higher form of society."

Hungarian philosopher György Lukács, in contrast to most of his Marxist contemporaries, claimed that Romanticism is a bourgeois and not feudal intellectual current, a movement in the crossroads of the great historical transformation of feudal big property into capitalist property. Georgi Plekhanov wrote of the Romantics: "these people were accusers against the bourgeoisie, and eventually became apologists for capitalism". Likewise, Dimitris Glinos was of the opinion that Romanticism represented "a compromise between the middle class intelligentsia and the feudal nobility, particularly in Germany meaning the submission of the former to the latter.

According to Franz Mehring, "for the Romantics, national ideals could only be found in the Middle Ages, where the class domination of the Junkers and clergy was very intense. Thus the Romantic poets resorted to the "moonlit magical night of the Middle Ages", but because Medieval ideals could not be reinvented in all their past magic after the revolutionary storm that swept everything in Europe, the Romantics "mixed up the Medieval wine they took from the cellars of castles and monasteries, with a few drops of pure water of modern Enlightenment". Romanticism in the economic, political, religious field pursued a restoration of the Middle Ages, which after the historical collapse of the Medieval social formations inevitably resulted in a fantastic beautification of the feudal methods of exploitation".

Otto Grotewohl noted in 1948: "Romanticism sought models in the dark mysticism of the Middle Ages and viewed with complete contempt not only democracy and revolution but also the emancipation of the people". Heinrich Heine, himself a Romantic, in his work "Die Romantische Schule" (1833) stated that the poets of the Romantic school "escaped from the present to the past and tried to restore the Middle Ages".

Anatoly Lunacharsky asserted in 1924 that "in Germany Romanticism was reactionary, because it abandoned the way of revolutionary change and had a strong tendency towards mysticism, [but] in the direction of its goal Romanticism was petty bourgeois, and therefore it could not be too strongly monarchist. From this point of view one can say that Romanticism was culturally reactionary, but in politics it was not reactionary. On the contrary, the German Romantics were always politically moving forward, even though they did not know exactly where to." Lunacharsky's assessment is repeated by A. S. Dmitriev who concludes: "Lunacharsky therefore considers German Romanticism to be a contradictory phenomenon, which, despite the tendency towards reactionary positions, the progressive tendency prevailed over the regressive one."

A. Vishnevsky (1941) made the following assessment: "As the first reaction against the establishment of a new capitalist reality, Romanticism contained a positive, historically progressive content. It enriched the culture of European peoples with an all-embracing, although still rather vague awareness of the contradictions of the onset of the capitalist epoch and in the atom sense represents a significant step forward in the ideological and artistic development of mankind. Romanticism was a necessary step in the development of national self-awareness, in its enrichment with the fruits of its own historical life."

Aleksandr Borozdin describes the pros and cons of German Romanticism in the following manner:

The Romantics thought it was necessary to study the Middle Ages not out of historical interest alone, but for the practical purpose of rejuvenating the dry, rational atmosphere created by the century of enlightenment for the national revival of Germany. In fact, in this tendentious study of the Middle Ages there was much that was false, but it served its purpose, giving rise to the development of medieval history. which soon managed to go on a completely scientific path. National tendencies were also quite legitimate in the era of oppression in Germany, and they had their useful side; but Romanticism, in its fascination with antiquity, was very much detached from modern life and was an obliging helper of all reactionary aspirations.

D. S. Mirsky followed Lukács in refusing to see Romanticism as a counter-revolutionary movement, instead stressing its contradictory nature in its various stages of development. He stated: "The Romantic features of this entire European literature are by their very nature not hostile to the general line of the bourgeois revolution. The unprecedented attention to the "innermost life of the heart" reflected one of the most important aspects of the cultural revolution that accompanied the growth of the political revolution: the birth of a person free from feudal guild ties and religious authority, which made possible the development of bourgeois relations. But in the development of the bourgeois revolution (in the broad sense), the self-affirmation of the individual inevitably came into conflict with the real course of history." Mirsky divided the course of Romanticism into three stages:

At the first stage, Romanticism is still a definite democratic movement and retains a politically radical character, but its revolutionary character is already purely abstract and repels itself from concrete forms of revolution, from the Jacobin dictatorship, and from the people's revolution in general. It is most vividly expressed in Germany in the system of Fichte's subjective idealism, which is nothing more than the philosophy of an "ideal" democratic revolution that takes place only in the head of a bourgeois-democratic idealist. Parallel phenomena to this in England are the works of William Blake, especially his Songs of Experience.

At the second stage, finally disillusioned with the real revolution, Romanticism looks for ways to realize the ideal outside of politics and finds it primarily in the activities of free creative imagination. The concept of the artist as a creator who spontaneously creates a new reality from his fantasy, which played a huge role in bourgeois aesthetics, arises. This stage, representing the maximum sharpening of the specificity of Romanticism, was especially clearly expressed in Germany. As the first stage is associated with Fichte, so the second is associated with Schelling, to whom the philosophical development of the idea of the artist-creator belongs. In England, this stage, without presenting the philosophical wealth that we find in Germany, in a much more naked form represents an escape from reality into the realm of free fantasy, at first in the verses of Wordsworth and later in the democratic Romantic Shelley.

[...] The third stage is Romanticism's final transition to a reactionary position. Disappointed in the real revolution, weighed down by the fantasticness and sterility of his lonely "creativity", the Romantic seeks support in super-personal forces - nationality and religion ... It is at this stage that Romanticism achieves a lot for the revival and study of folklore, especially folk songs. And it must be admitted that, despite its reactionary goals, Romanticism's work in this area is of significant and lasting value. Romanticism did much to study the true life of the masses, preserved under the yoke of feudalism and early capitalism.

Romantic literature
A short definition of the term "Romantic" has been given by the German Brockhaus Encyclopedia in its 1940 Sprach-Brockhaus edition:

1) Direction of the spiritual life, which emphasizes the emotional experience more than the intellectual; esp. German spiritual movement at the time of Napoleon. 2) the feeling-filled, wonderful, everything fairytale-like, wishful, seemingly unreal.

Vissarion Belinsky in his articles about Alexander Pushkin has given the following definition of the Romantic mood:
Romanticism is nothing more than the inner world of a person's soul, the innermost life of his heart. A mysterious source of Romanticism lies in the chest and heart of a person: feeling, love is a manifestation or action of Romanticism, and therefore almost every person is a Romantic. The only exception remains either for egoists who, apart from themselves, cannot love anyone, or for people in whom the sacred grain of sympathy and antipathy is suppressed and drowned out, either by moral underdevelopment, or the material needs of a poor and rough life. Here is the very first, natural concept of Romanticism.

For György Lukács, Romanticism was a contradictory movement, combining elements that revolutionized art and culture with others that impeded its forward movement. He gave the following description of these contradictions of Romanticism and especially of its German variety:

In spite of the noting and branding of reaction and decadence, one must not overlook the fact that in Romanticism appears the reflection of the first – albeit confused and weak – popular movement in Germany since the Peasants’ War: hence the strong return to popular life, to folk art, whereby the Herder period of the German Enlightenment is renewed in an intensified form. There is certainly not a little artistic gimmick in these reversals, but at the same time gates are opened for genuine folk poetry. Above all, one should think of collections such as the folk poems collection Des Knaben Wunderhorn and the Grimm brothers’ fairytales. But this development is not limited to a mere collection of existing treasures of folk poetry. In addition to the almost unbearable artificiality in the main stream of Romantic lyric poetry, there is also a real, folk song-like resumption of the poetic endeavors of the young Goethe (such folk poetry is in the general direction of the period and often arises entirely independently of Romanticism, as in Hebbel); In addition to purely artistic fairy tales and refined, informal novellas, there is also a genuinely folkish art of narration. Both tendencies are most pronounced in Eichendorff, whose best works are rightfully alive until today.

D. S. Mirsky identified the origins of Romanticism in the naturalistic and emotion-based tendencies of European literature in the second half of the 18th century: "The taste for the "romantic" developed in close connection with the growing cult of the "natural" as opposed to the "artificial", of feeling as opposed to reason. These phenomena are inseparable from that omnipotent subjectivism ("sentimentalism") that dominated the European literature in the decades before the French Revolution, accompanying the growth of bourgeois democratic aspirations (Rousseau and others).

A. Vishnevsky wrote: The artistic charm of the best examples of Romantic art is undeniable. Romantics have reached a higher level of knowledge of folk life, the hidden sources of fantasy and creativity. During this period, the greatness of the historical past of peoples, the creations of folk fantasy, myths, beliefs, legends, fairy tales, art and poetry of the Middle Ages and the Renaissance, finally emerged from the age-old oblivion. Romantics restored the rights of Shakespeare, Dante, Cervantes, Calderón, the poetry of the East. This wealth of the former culture came to life in the creations of the Romantic poetry and contributed to the liberation of art from the narrowness of 18th century Classicism. Knowledge of the historical past of peoples, both in scientific and artistic form, owes much to Romanticism. In this regard, an important role was played by the novels of Walter Scott, the works of the French historians Guizot, Mignet, Thierry, the history of language and poetry, created by the brothers Grimm. But the historicism of the Romantics is one-sided and limited, for the most part, by an interest in the Middle Ages.

Pyotr Semyonovich Kogan summarized the essence of Romanticism and its eventual replacement by Realism in the face of 19th century industrialization and urbanization as follows: The Romantics cursed the age of statistics and political economy and fled from its prosaic needs to the mountains or found solace in the boundless width of the ocean ... But inevitably even in the work of such a poet as Hugo, the noise of the street and the complaints of the hungry proletariat burst in and drowned out the gloomy sounds of medieval organs and the tender songs of Oriental odalisques.

Communist literary critic Franz Mehring summarized the importance of Romanticism for the development of German culture as follows:

[Romanticism] has rediscovered the treasures of medieval poetry, not only the courtly and knightly poets, but also the Nibelungs, a German national epic that can probably compete with the Homeric chants. Above all, the Romantic school of poetry unearthed the precious treasures of folk poetry; the fairy tales of the Brothers Grimm and Des Knaben Wunderhorn, a collection of old folk songs edited by Arnim and Brentano. In addition, we owe the Romantics an extraordinary expansion of our poetic scope; since they had no solid ground under their feet, they wandered off to the artistic treasures of all peoples and times and brought home many excellent things like Schlegel's classic translation of Shakespeare.

A. S. Dmitriev concludes: "The Romantic era constituted the best decades of German literature. I wish without any doubt to conclude that German Romanticism, both in its theory and in poetry and prose, is one of the most brilliant phenomena of world literature."

References

Romanticism
Marxism–Leninism